Mariental is a city of 10,000 inhabitants in south-central Namibia, lying on the B1 national road  north of Keetmanshoop and  southeast of Windhoek. Mariental is connected to the TransNamib railway line from Windhoek to Keetmanshoop. The town and the surrounding area are in a hot, arid region.

Mariental is the administrative capital of the Hardap Region in an area which has long been a centre for the Nama people. It lies near the Hardap Dam, the second largest reservoir in Namibia.

History 
Named by local Rhenish (German Lutheran) missionaries, the town was founded in 1912 as a railway stop between Windhoek and Keetmanshoop and named after Maria, the wife of the first colonial settler of the area, Hermann Brandt. It is home to the oldest Dutch Reformed church congregation in Namibia, founded in 1898. It was proclaimed a town in 1920 and a municipality in 1946. Mariental is home to a large number of Nama-speaking people, descendants of the early Khoi inhabitants of Namibia. The people of Mariental are known for their big smiles and hospitality.

Geography

Hardap dam

It supplies the city with water and controls the flow of the Fish River which flows in a southerly direction past the town. Construction began in 1960 and completed in 1963.

Before the dam was built, Mariental was flooded in 1923 and 1934. However, whenever dam sluices have to be opened fully due to good rains in the Fish River's catchment area, Mariental is still prone to floods, with reed grasses growing in the riverbed of Fish slowing down the flow of water and aggravating the danger.

Floods after the commissioning of the dam occurred in 1972, 1974, 1976, 2000, and 2006. Since then, the dam's water level is kept at a maximum of 70% of its capacity to prevent both an overflow and an uncontrolled outflow through fully opened sluices.

Climate
Mariental has a hot desert climate (Köppen climate classification BWh), with extremely hot summers and  very warm winters (with warm days and cold nights).

Economy 
The nearby Hardap Dam is the largest reservoir in Namibia and provides water for irrigation, making possible to cultivate animal fodder, as well as corn, fruits and vegetables.  The town is surrounded by flourishing commercial farms which, due to the low annual rainfall in the area focus on game farming as well as sheep and  ostrich farming which along with cattle farming remain popular in the region. Export grapes, cotton lucern and dairy farming is also sustained by irrigation from the Hardap Dam.

A local ostrich abattoir used to cater for this increasingly important industry, but recently went bankrupt, and what survives of the karakul trade in the south is centered around Mariental. Sitting astride the main route into the Kalahari and Namib Deserts, Mariental also services the needs of farmers in these areas. Mariental also boasts some of the best safari and hunting experiences in Namibia at lodges like Lapa Lange and Anib Lodge. Available game include springbuck, blesbuck, giraffe, ostrich, leopard, zebra, kudu, gemsbuck, hartebeest, eland, blue- and black wildebeest.

The German association “Fahrräder für Afrika e.V.” (Bicycles for Africa) has built a “Bicycle Empowerment Centre” in the town together with the Catholic Aids Action (CAA) and the Bicycling Empowerment Network (BEN) Namibia. Local people infected with the HI-virus were trained to repair and build bikes and also received the know-how to run the workshop on their own. Second-hand Bicycles are being sold at low prices to the inhabitants of the region, allowing easy travel and transportation, while the income from the workshops is also used to finance local aid projects. The project is supported by governmental agencies in Germany and Namibia.

Politics
Mariental is governed by a municipal council that has seven seats.

The 2015 local authority election was won by the SWAPO party which gained six seats (1,325 votes). The remaining seat went to the Democratic Turnhalle Alliance (DTA, 139 votes). The 2020 local authority election was won by the newly formed Landless People's Movement (LPM) which scored well all over Hardap. LPM gained 1,726 votes and four seats in the city council, followed by SWAPO with two seats (906 votes). The likewise new Independent Patriots for Change (IPC) obtained the remaining seat with 180 votes.

References 

Cities in Namibia
Mariental, Namibia
Regional capitals in Namibia
Populated places in the Hardap Region
Populated places established in 1912
1912 establishments in German South West Africa